The Prosna is a river in central Poland, a tributary of the Warta river (near Pyzdry), with a length of 227 kilometres and a basin area of 4,917 km2 (all in Poland). Until 1918, it marked the westernmost border of the Russian Empire. The Towns of Kalisz and Chocz were right on the old frontier. After the proclaimation of the second Polish Republic it marked the Border between Interwar Germany and Poland.

Towns
Gorzów Śląski
Praszka
Wieruszów
Grabów nad Prosną
Kalisz
Chocz

See also
 Rivers of Poland

References

Rivers of Poland
Rivers of Opole Voivodeship
Rivers of Łódź Voivodeship
Rivers of Greater Poland Voivodeship